Mohammad Ali Shaikh  is the vice-chancellor of Sindh Madressatul Islam University, Karachi, Pakistan.

Education 
Muhammad Ali Shaikh was born in Khairpur, Sindh, Pakistan.

Muhammad Ali Shaikh graduated with a degree in engineering from Mehran University of Engineering and Technology, Jamshoro in 1985 and holds a PhD degree in Mass Communication from the University of Karachi.

Career

Academic career
On 21 July 1994, he was appointed Principal, Sindh Madressatul Islam College, when the college needed a lot of attention and even lacked some basic facilities. After 24 years of heading this college, he has transformed it from a typical public sector college to a quality university. He saw to it that it was upgraded from a college to a university in 2012.

Positions held
 Director-General, Sindh Environmental Protection Agency
 Chairman, Sindh Textbook Board, Jamshoro
 Director-General, Sindh Coastal Development Authority

Publications 

Muhammad Ali Shaikh has written books on the subjects of education and communication as well as biographies of leading personalities of South Asian origin.

Satellite Television & Social Change in Pakistan: A Case Study of Rural Sindh. The book discusses the role of satellite television in bringing social change in Pakistan through a case study of rural Sindh.
Benazir Bhutto: A Political Biography. Published by Orient Books Publishing House as an international edition in 2000, the book traces Bhutto's life as well as the past of the Bhutto family, The book has been translated into many languages.

References

1961 births
Living people
Sindhi people
Pakistani educators
University of Karachi alumni
People from Khairpur District
Vice-Chancellors of universities in Pakistan
Mehran University of Engineering & Technology alumni
Academic staff of Mehran University of Engineering & Technology
Vice-Chancellors of the Sindh Madressatul Islam University